Cyril Edward Lloyd (1876–19 February 1963)  was an English businessman and Conservative Member of Parliament between 1922 and 1929, and again from 1941 to 1945. He was a member of the Lloyds banking family, but made his career in engineering, serving as chairman of N. Hingley & Sons Ltd for more than forty years.

Life and career
Lloyd was the son of Howard Lloyd of Grafton Manor, Bromsgrove, Worcestershire, a member of the Lloyds banking family. He was educated at Uppingham School, after which, in 1894, he attended the Mason Science College in Birmingham, and for a time undertook private study in Vienna. From 1897 to 1899 he was apprenticed as a pattern-maker in Rugby with the engineering firm Willans and Robinson. In 1899 he joined the office of F. H. Medhurst, an electrical engineer, and in 1901 he became a member of the Institution of Civil Engineers.

Lloyd became a director of the steelfounders F. H. Lloyd and Co, owned by relations, but his principal business post was as chairman of N. Hingley & Sons Ltd, manufacturer of ship's cables, anchors and other equipment; he held the position from 1918, becoming the company's president in 1961. He was also a director of Lloyds Bank, the National Bank of Scotland and the Great Western Railway. In 1909 he married Phyllis Gretchen, daughter of the painter Sir Ernest Waterlow; they had one daughter.

A Conservative, Lloyd served two terms as Member of Parliament for Dudley. He was first elected at the general election of 1922, and won again, with a much-reduced majority in 1923 and 1924.  He lost the seat in 1929. His second term was from July 1941, when he held the seat for the Conservatives after the sitting member, Dudley Joel, was killed on active service. Lloyd retired in 1945 and did not contest the seat in that year's general election. In the House of Commons he concentrated on industry, Midlands affairs, and the welfare of personnel in the armed forces.

Away from parliament, Lloyd became President of the National Federation of Iron and Steel Manufacturers in 1925 and High Sheriff of Worcestershire in 1935. He was a member of the United Kingdom Sugar Industry Inquiry Committee from 1934–35, and submitted a minority report, dissenting from his colleagues' recommendation that public subsidy of sugar beet production should be discontinued.  In 1959, when he was eighty-two, he received the Freedom of the County Borough of Dudley.

Lloyd died at his home near Stourbridge at the age of eighty-six.

Notes

References

External links 
 
 
 
 
 
 
 
 

 

1876 births
1963 deaths
Conservative Party (UK) MPs for English constituencies
Directors of the Great Western Railway
English civil engineers
English ironmasters
High Sheriffs of Worcestershire
People from Moseley
Politicians from Worcestershire
UK MPs 1922–1923
UK MPs 1923–1924
UK MPs 1924–1929
UK MPs 1935–1945